Ali ibn Ziyad at-Tarabulsi al-Tunisi al-'Absi  (d. 799 CE) (183 AH), more commonly referred to in Islamic scholarship as Ali ibn Ziyad or Imam al-Tarabulsi, was an 8th-century CE Tunisian Muslim jurist from Tripoli. Ibn Ziyad was an important early scholar of the Maliki school of Islamic jurisprudence (fiqh) and a companion of Imam Malik. Ali ibn Ziyad was responsible for bringing the Muwatta of Imam Malik to Ifriqiya. He died in 799 CE and is buried in the remains of the Silsila Cemetery in the Qasba quarter of Tunis's medina (old-town).

References 

799 deaths
Libyan scholars
Libyan Maliki scholars
Libyan Muslims
Tunisian Maliki scholars
Year of birth missing
8th-century jurists